North Cornwall by-election may refer to:

 1932 North Cornwall by-election
 1939 North Cornwall by-election